Caparica is a former civil parish in the municipality (concelho) of Almada, Lisbon metropolitan area, Portugal. In 2013, the parish merged with the civil parish of Trafaria into the new parish Caparica e Trafaria. The population in 2011 was 20,454, in an area of 11.02 km2.

Location

Caparica is situated on the Setúbal Peninsula, south of the Tagus River. On the opposite bank of the Tagus lies Belém, a civil parish of Lisbon. Caparica lies west of the central part of Almada Municipality and west of the 25 de Abril Bridge.

History

The name Caparica is probably derived from the Latin word capparis, which means caper. Caparica may have been founded during the Roman conquest of the Iberian Peninsula.  It became a parish in 1472, and it became a town on September 27, 1985.

Localities
The parish of Caparica includes the following localities:

Vila Nova de Caparica
Capuchos
Funchalinho
Areeiro
Granja
Fómega
Alcaniça
Raposo
Pera
Monte de Caparica
Torre 
Fonte Santa
Serrado
Pilotos
Costas de Cão
Banática
Porto Brandão
Lazarim

Points of interest

Convent of the Capuchins
Church of Nossa Senhora do Monte de Caparica
Forte de São Sebastião da Caparica

References

Former parishes of Almada